Hypocala subsatura is a species of moth in the family Erebidae. It is found from the Oriental region to Sundaland.

Adults have variable forewings, with a common and distinctive form that has an undulating grey border to the dorsum and a similar lens-shaped grey patch subapically on the costa.

Larvae have been recorded feeding on Diospyros, Quercus, Garcinia, Caesalpinia, Carapa and Xylocarpus species. There are also records for Malus and Citrus species, but these might be related to adult feeding.

References

Moths described in 1852
Hypocalinae
Moths of Africa
Moths of Asia
Moths of Japan